The Bratz franchise's virtual band released six soundtrack albums, three compilation albums, one extended play, four singles and three music videos.

Their debut single "Show Me What You Got", featuring BoA and Howie D. of the Backstreet Boys, was released in August 2003. The song was accompanied by two b-sides: "Can U Feel the Beat" and "Distance". It was followed by the release of "Look Around", featuring Christina Milian and Verbal, in November 2003. Both "Show Me What You Got" and "Look Around" were released by Avex Trax exclusively for the Japanese market.

In July 2005, their first soundtrack album, Rock Angelz, was released by Hip-O Records. The album peaked at number 79 on the Billboard 200, becoming their highest charting album in the United States. It also reached the top 30 in Australia and Norway, the top 40 in Scotland the top 50 in the United Kingdom. The album produced the hit single "So Good", which peaked at number five in Norway, 14 in Australia and in the top 30 in New Zealand and the United Kingdom. The song was nominated for a Daytime Emmy Award in 2007 for Outstanding Original Song for a Children's Animated Show.

Their second soundtrack album, Genie Magic, was released in April 2006. It was less successful than its predecessor, peaking at 106 in the United States, and failing to chart internationally. Forever Diamondz followed in September 2006 and managed to peak at number 40 in Australia and 184 in the United States. Their fourth soundtrack album, Fashion Pixiez, was released in February 2007 and peaked at number 166 in the United States. This was followed by the release of Bratz: Motion Picture Soundtrack in July 2007, which peaked at number 83 in the United States. Their sixth and final soundtrack album, Girlz Really Rock, was released in July 2008 and failed to chart on any national charts. Two compilation albums, Bratz Girlz and Bratz Girlz 2 were released under the Bratz banner in December 2007 and December 2008. They peaked at number 19 and 21 on the UK Compilation Chart, respectively, and the former was certified silver by the British Phonographic Industry (BPI).

Albums

Soundtrack albums

Compilation albums

Extended plays

Singles

Music videos

Notes

References

Pop music discographies
Discography
Discographies of American artists
Bratz